Jasper Township is one of eleven townships in Camden County, Missouri, USA.  As of the 2000 census, its population was 5,027.

Jasper Township was established in 2020, and most likely named after William Jasper.

Geography
It contains seven cemeteries: Anderson, Banner, Carver, Rockdale, Shawnee Bend, Stevens Banner and Wilson.

The streams of Brush Creek, Camp Branch and Spring Cove run through this township.

Transportation
Jasper Township contains two airports or landing strips: Mud Harbor Seaplane Base and Tan Tar A Resort Seaplane Base.

References

 USGS Geographic Names Information System (GNIS)

External links
 US-Counties.com

Townships in Camden County, Missouri
Townships in Missouri